The following is a list of notable people who were born in, lived in or are associated with the city of Bartow, Florida.

Entertainment
 Jaime Faith Edmondson, Playboy Playmate, born in Bartow
 Matt West, born in Bartow

Government and politics

 Charles O. Andrews, U.S. Senator from 1938–1946; attended the South Florida Military Institute in Bartow
 Frank Clark, former Bartow City attorney, U.S. Representative for the 2nd District 1905-1925
 Stephen H. Grimes, former Florida Supreme Court Chief Justice
 Katherine Harris, former U.S. Congressman, Florida 13th District; Florida's Secretary of State during the controversial Florida Recount of 2000
 Spessard Holland, 28th Florida governor and U.S. senator; author of the 24th amendment to the Constitution of the United States
 Jack Latvala, Member of Florida Senate. Candidate for governor, 2018. 
 Adam Putnam, former U.S. Congressman, Florida Secretary of Agriculture, and candidate for Governor 2018
 Jacob Summerlin, the "King of the Crackers", first baby born in Florida after it was ceded from Spain to the United States; founder of both Bartow and Orlando, Florida

Military

 Albert H. Blanding, general
 J. Adrian Jackson, Rear Admiral U.S. Navy
 Evander McIvor Law, Confederate general during American Civil War
 James Van Fleet, general during the Korean War

Sports

 Johnny Burnett, MLB player for the Cleveland Indians and St. Louis Browns 1927–1935
 Darryl Carlton, NFL player (Tampa Bay Buccaneers), born in Bartow June 24, 1953
 Desmond Clark, NFL player (Denver Broncos, Miami Dolphins, Chicago Bears), born in Bartow April 20, 1977
 Marcus Floyd, NFL player, New York Jets,  Buffalo Bills and Carolina Panthers, born in Bartow Oct 12, 1978
 Kenneth Gant, born in Bartow April 18, 1967
 Adarius Glanton, NFL player
 Torrian Gray, NFL player (Minnesota Vikings), born in Bartow March 18, 1974
 Alonzo Highsmith, NFL player, born in Bartow
 Ray Lewis, NFL linebacker (Baltimore Ravens), born in Bartow May 15, 1975
 Tracy McGrady, NBA player (Atlanta Hawks), born in Bartow May 24, 1979
 Jason Odom, former NFL player for the Tampa Bay Buccaneers 1996-1999; graduated from Bartow High School
 Ken Riley, born in Bartow August 6, 1947; former Pro Football Hall of Fame cornerback with the Cincinnati Bengals.
 James Roberson, NFL football player, born in Bartow
 Sam Silas, NFL football player for the St. Louis Cardinals, New York Giants and San Francisco 49ers 1964-1970, born in Homeland in 1940, graduated from Union Academy
 Jerry Simmons, NFL offensive tackle 1965-1974; graduated from Union Academy
 Theron Smith, NBA player (Charlotte Bobcats), born in Bartow Oct 3, 1980
 James "Bubba" Stewart, born in Bartow; the world's foremost Supercrosser
 Adarius Taylor, NFL Linebacker, born in Bartow
 Keydrick Vincent, NFL player (Baltimore Ravens), born in Bartow Apr 13, 1978
 Rick Wilson, NASCAR driver

Other

 Robert McGrady Blackburn, Methodist bishop
 Armando Gutierrez, banker, owner of WQXM, spokesman for family of Elian Gonzalez
 Marshall Ledbetter, photographer, psychedelics enthusiast, iconoclast and unconventional protester, born in Bartow
 Nelson Serrano, infamous murderer
 Charlie Smith, famous centenarian, claimed to be the oldest person in American history (137)
 Ossian Sweet, Detroit physician best known for the Sweet Trials, defended by Clarence Darrow; born and raised in Bartow
 Michael Tomasello, developmental psychologist and anthropologist, National Academy of Sciences

References

Bartow
Bartow
List